Mojmír Stuchlík (30 June 1930 - 10 September 2016) was a Czech ski jumper. He competed in the individual event at the 1956 Winter Olympics.

References

External links
 

1930 births
2016 deaths
Czech male ski jumpers
Olympic ski jumpers of Czechoslovakia
Ski jumpers at the 1956 Winter Olympics
People from Semily
Sportspeople from the Liberec Region